Nina Berton (born 3 August 2001) is a Luxembourgian professional racing cyclist, who currently rides for UCI Women's Continental Team . She rode in the women's road race event at the 2020 UCI Road World Championships.

References

External links

2001 births
Living people
Luxembourgian female cyclists
Place of birth missing (living people)
Cyclists at the 2018 Summer Youth Olympics